Nikolay Konstantionovich Simonov (December 4, 1901 – April 20, 1973) was a Soviet film and stage actor. People's Artist of the USSR (1950).

Biography

Early life and education
Nikolay Simonov was born on December 4, 1901, in Samara, Russia. From 1917–1919 he studied art at Samara School of Art and Design. From 1919–1923 he studied art at the Imperial Academy of Arts. From 1922–1924 he studied acting at the Saint Petersburg State Theatre Arts Academy, from which he graduated with honors in 1924.

Career

From 1924–1973, He was a permanent member with the company of Pushkin Drama Theatre in St. Petersburg. During the 1950s and 1960s he was also the theatre's artistic director.

Simonov made his film debut in 1924 and played supporting roles in five Russian silent films. He shot to fame after his role of Commander Zhikharev in the classic film Chapaev (1934) by the Vasilyev brothers.

Simonov's portrayal of Peter the Great in The Conquests of Peter the Great (1937 and 1938) brought him international fame and numerous awards. This portrayal was the one used to define Peter the Great for American audiences in Frank Capra's 1943 propaganda film The Battle of Russia, which used brief clips from the Soviet films.

Simonov was considered to be a patriarch of the St. Petersburg school of acting. Simonov's stage performances were legendary; several of his stage works were filmed for a historic record. His leading role in The Living Corpse, an adaptation of the book by Leo Tolstoy, is remembered as one of the highest achievements in stage acting in Russian theatre. Simonov's portrayal of Antonio Salieri in Mozart and Salieri from The Little Tragedies by Alexander Pushkin won him a Stanislavski State Prize award in 1962. Simonov regarded acting on stage as superior to acting in film; he supported the similar position of Constantin Stanislavski and Vladimir Nemirovich-Danchenko.

Marriage and children
Simonov was also the father of a remarkable family. His wife was an actress and his son, Nikolay Nikolaevich Simonov, was a famous surgeon in Russia.

Death and afterward
Nikolay Simonov died on April 20, 1973, in St. Petersburg and was laid to rest in the Necropolis of Masters of Arts at Alexander Nevsky Lavra.

Filmography
    Red Partisans (1924) as Dolgov
Katerina Izmailova (1927) as Sergey
Khabu (1928) as Yegor
Kastus Kalinovskiy (1928) as Kastus Kalinovskiy
Brother (1929) as Fyodor Gorbachyov
 A Lad from the Banks of the Missouri (1932) as Iogann Timan
Chapaev (1934) as Zhikharev
  Miracles (1934) as Fyodor, his son
Hectic Days (1935) as Tank Commander Mikhail Trofimovich Belokon
Peter the Great I  (1937) as Peter the Great
Peter the Great II (1938) as Peter the Great
The Battle of Stalingrad, Part I (1949) as Lt. Gen. Vasily Chuikov
The Battle of Stalingrad, Part II (1949) as Lt. Gen. Chuikov 
Living Dead (1952) as Fyodor Protasov
Belinsky (1953) as landlord
 The Gadfly (1955) as Cardinal Montanelli
Geroite na Shipka (1955) as Otto von Bismarck
Amphibian Man (1962) as Prof. Salvator
 Workers' Quarters (1965) as Sotnikov
 Suspicion (1972) as Berlach

Awards and honors
1938: Order of Lenin
1941: Stalin Prize, 1st class
1947: USSR State Prize, 2nd class
1950: USSR State Prize
1950: People's Artist of the USSR   for his role of General Chuikov
1966: Stanislavsky State Prize of the RSFSR  for the performance of roles Matthias Clausen and Salieri in productions of "Before Sunset" by Hauptmann, and "Little Tragedies" by Pushkin
1967: Order of Lenin
1971: Hero of Socialist Labour
1971: Order of Lenin

References

External links

1901 births
1973 deaths
Actors from Samara, Russia
People from Samarsky Uyezd
Russian male film actors
Russian male silent film actors
Russian male stage actors
Soviet male silent film actors
Soviet male actors
Belarusfilm films
Russian State Institute of Performing Arts alumni
People's Artists of the USSR
Stalin Prize winners
Recipients of the USSR State Prize
Heroes of Socialist Labour
Recipients of the Order of Lenin